Tutton is a British surname that may refer to:

Aden Tutton (born 1984), Australian volleyball player
Alan Tutton (born 1973), English football player
Alexander P. Tutton (1823–1893), Supervisor of Internal Revenue under President Ulysses S. Grant during the Whiskey Ring scandal
Alfred Edwin Howard Tutton (1864–1938), British mineralogist; identifier of Tutton's salts; namesake of Tutton Point in Antarctica
Chloe Tutton (born 1996), Welsh swimmer
Chris Tutton, English poet, musician, songwriter, playwright, and performer
Diana Tutton (1915–1991), British novelist

English-language surnames